H99 may refer to:
 HMCS Chaudière (H99), a H-class destroyer which was commissioned by the Royal Canadian Navy
 HMS Hero (H99), a H-class destroyer of the Royal Navy